Arkabutla Creek is a stream in the U.S. state of Mississippi. It is a tributary to the Coldwater River.

Arkabutla is a name derived from the Choctaw language.

References

Rivers of Mississippi
Rivers of Panola County, Mississippi
Rivers of Tate County, Mississippi
Mississippi placenames of Native American origin